The 2020–21 New Orleans Privateers men's basketball team represented the University of New Orleans during the 2020–21 NCAA Division I men's basketball season. The Privateers were led by tenth-year head coach Mark Slessinger and played their home games at Lakefront Arena as members of the Southland Conference.

Previous season 
The Privateers finished the season 9–21, 5–15 in Southland play to finish in a tie for 11th place. They failed to qualify for the Southland Conference tournament.

Roster

Schedule and results

|-
!colspan=9 style=|Non-conference Regular season

|-
!colspan=9 style=|Southland Regular season

|-
!colspan=9 style=| Southland tournament

Source:

References

New Orleans Privateers men's basketball seasons
New Orleans
New Orleans Privateers men's basketball
New Orleans Privateers men's basketball